Raymond Henry "Sandy" Adsett  (born 27 August 1939) is a New Zealand visual artist and educator. He is acknowledged for championing the art of kōwhaiwhai painting, creating a context for the artform within the development of contemporary Māori art. 

In 2020 Adsett was honoured by the Arts Foundation of New Zealand with an Icon Whakamana Hiranga award "for his profound impact on the Māori community and Māori arts education system within Aotearoa."

Biography 
Adsett was born in Raupunga near Wairoa on 27 August 1939. Of Māori descent, he affiliates to Ngāti Kahungunu and Ngāti Pāhauwera. He attended Te Aute College in Hawkes Bay. His interest in art first began on his family farm as a way to fill in time and grew from there.

He received his first formal art training at Ardmore Teachers' College in Auckland. He completed his third year of teachers' college in Dunedin. While at Ardmore, he began travelling to regional schools to introduce Māori arts into the school syllabus. This was a focus of his work that would continue throughout his life. He was one of a group of teachers that started this work in the 1960s. 

In 1961, Adsett became an arts specialist for the Department of Education's Advisory Service, within a programme established by educational leader Gordon Tovey. Adsett has cited the mentorship of the Ngāti Porou master carver Pine Taiapa as the most significant influence on his life as an artist and educator. Adsett's role in the department was helping introduce the new Māori Arts in Schools programme. 

In 1991, Adsett became a principal tutor at Tairawhiti Polytechnic in Gisborne, working in the Toihoukura School of Māori Visual Arts. He took over from Ivan Ehau, the founder of the school, who had died that year. Adsett was involved in formatting a wānanga arts direction for the progamme.

In 2002, Adsett returned to Hawke's Bay, where he set up the Toimairangi School of Māori Visual Culture within Te Wānanga o Aotearoa in Hastings. He continues to work there as an adjunct professor.

Outside of his work in the education sector, Adsett's own artwork has been included in major art exhibitions. This includes: "Headlands" (1992) in Sydney, Australia; "Te Waka Toi" (1992-1994), which toured the United States; and "Toi tū Toi Ora" at Auckland Art Gallery.

Honours and awards
In the 2005 New Year Honours, Adsett was appointed a Member of the New Zealand Order of Merit, for services to art. In 2014, Adsett was conferred an honorary doctorate by Massey University, and he received Te Tohu o Te Papa Tongarewa Rongomaraeroa award in the 2018 Te Waka Toi Awards.

In 2020, Adsett was named as an Arts Foundation of New Zealand Icon, an honour limited to 20 living New Zealanders.

Collections

Adsett's work is held in public gallery collections throughout Aotearoa New Zealand, including:

 Auckland Art Gallery Toi o Tāmaki
 Waikato Museum Te Whare Taonga o Waikato
 Tairawhiti Museum Te Whare Taonga o te Tairawhiti
 Sarjeant Gallery Te Whare o Rehua Whanganui
 Museum of New Zealand Te Papa Tongarewa

References

External links
Te Waka Toi Awards Te Ao Maori News, 7 December 2014 (video interview)
Sandy Adsett - Te Waka Toi Awards 2018, CreativeNZ, 19 November 2018 (video interview)
Influence: Dr Sandy Adsett, Te Ahi Kaa, RNZ, 5 May 2019 (radio interview) 
Artist Sandy Adsett honoured with Arts Foundation medal, Seven Sharp, 3 July 2020 (television clip)
New Arts Icon Sandy Adsett, Saturday Morning, RNZ, 4 July 2020 (radio interview)

1939 births
Living people
Members of the New Zealand Order of Merit
New Zealand Māori artists
Ngāti Kahungunu people
Ngāti Pāhauwera people
20th-century New Zealand artists
21st-century New Zealand artists
New Zealand painters
People from the Hawke's Bay Region
University of Otago alumni